Button Islands are a group of islands of the Andaman Islands.  It belongs to the South Andaman administrative district, part of the Indian union territory of Andaman and Nicobar Islands.

History
Several lighthouses were established on the islands.
There is a lighthouse at the tallest hill  on North button island, established 1983.

There is a lighthouse at the tallest hill  on Middle button island, established 1983.

There is a lighthouse at the tallest hill  on south button island, established 1983.

Geography
The islands belong to the Ritchie’s Archipelago and are located north of Outram Island.
Besides a variety of submerged corals, Dolphin, Dugong and
Blue whale are important marine animals for conservation. These islands also forms abode to many
species of avifauna and fishes. Coral dominate the islands as submerged fringing types.

Administration
Politically, Button Islands are part of Port Blair Taluk. 
Rani Jhansi Marine National Park is located in the vicinity of the islands, which includes Middle Button Island National Park, South Button Island National Park, and North Button Island National Park.

References 

Ritchie's Archipelago
Islands of South Andaman district
Archipelagoes of the Andaman and Nicobar Islands
Tourist attractions in the Andaman and Nicobar Islands
Uninhabited islands of India